Anthranilate hydroxylase may refer to:

 Anthranilate 3-monooxygenase (FAD)
 Anthranilate 3-monooxygenase
 Anthranilate 1,2-dioxygenase (deaminating, decarboxylating)

sr:Antranilatna hidroksilaza